Non Sila is a district (amphoe) of Khon Kaen province, northeastern Thailand.

History
The minor district was established on 15 July 1996 by splitting it from Ban Phai district.

On 15 May 2007, all 81 minor districts were upgraded to full districts. With publication in the Royal Gazette on 24 August the upgrade became official.

Geography
Neighboring districts are (from the north clockwise) Ban Phai, Nong Song Hong, Phon, and Chonnabot.

Economy
, Thai sugar giant, the Mitr Phol Group, plans to construct a sugarcane mill and biomass power plant in the district. The initiative will occupy  of three of the province's neighbouring districts: Non Sila, Ban Phai, and Chonnabot. The operation will form part of the Ban Phai Bio-Hub Industrial Estate and is linked to the Eastern Economic Corridor (EEC) project. Mitr Phol's plans have been met with some opposition from local residents. Mitr Phol has pledged that the factory will have no adverse environmental effects.

Administration
The district is divided into five sub-districts (tambons), which are further subdivided into 45 villages (mubans). The township (thesaban tambon) Non Sila covers parts of tambons Non Sila and Ban Han. There are a further four tambon administrative organizations (TAO), the non-municipal area of tambon Non Sila is administered by a tambon administration (TA).

References

External links
amphoe.com

Non Sila